Killian Overmeire (born 6 December 1985) is a Belgian former professional footballer who played as a defensive midfielder.

Career
A youth exponent of Lokeren, Overmeire was active at the club from 2003 until 2020, where the club was declared bankrupt. He went on to play more than 400 league games for Lokeren. After the bankruptcy, Overmeire moved to Lokeren-Temse where he only made one cup appearance, before retiring from football in April 2021. He has since run two businesses with a partner.

Honours
Lokeren
Belgian Cup: 2011–12, 2013–14

References

External links

See also
List of one-club men

1985 births
Living people
Belgian footballers
Belgium international footballers
Belgium youth international footballers
Belgium under-21 international footballers
K.S.C. Lokeren Oost-Vlaanderen players
Belgian Pro League players
Association football midfielders
People from Lokeren
Footballers from East Flanders